The 2011 Women's Hockey Champions Challenge I was the fifth tournament of field hockey championship for women. It was held in Dublin, Ireland from June 18–26, 2011.

Teams
Eight teams participated in the tournament, they were:

Results
All times are Irish Standard Time (UTC+01:00)

First round

Pool A

Pool B

Second round

Quarterfinals

Fifth to eighth place classification

Crossover

Seventh and eighth place

Fifth and sixth place

First to fourth place classification

Semifinals

Third and fourth place

Final

Statistics

Final ranking

References

External links
Official website

2011
Champions Challenge I
2011 in Irish women's sport
Champions Challenge I
International sports competitions hosted by University College Dublin
2010s in Dublin (city)
June 2011 sports events in Europe